Denise N. George, also known as Denise George-Counts, is a U.S. Virgin Islands lawyer and former television news reporter who served as the Attorney General of the Virgin Islands. She completed a Bachelor of Arts in radio, television, and film at the University of Maryland, College Park. George completed a Juris Doctor from Howard University School of Law in 1984.

George had been the driving force behind the lawsuits filed against the estate of Jeffrey Epstein. The suit was settled in December 2022 with the estate agreeing  pay the Virgin Islands $105 million and half of the sale price of Epstein's Little Saint James Island.

On 27 December 2022, George filed a lawsuit in the US federal court in New York City, which alleged JPMorgan Chase "knowingly facilitated, sustained, and concealed the human trafficking network operated by Jeffrey Epstein" and "financially benefitted" from those actions.

She was removed from her post on 1 January 2023 by Governor Albert Bryan. The governor’s office said that media reports which linked George's sacking to her suit against JPMorgan were not "entirely" accurate.

References 

1959 births
20th-century African-American people
20th-century African-American women
20th-century American lawyers
20th-century American women lawyers
21st-century African-American people
21st-century African-American women
21st-century American lawyers
21st-century American women lawyers
African-American lawyers
African-American television hosts
African-American women lawyers
American television news anchors
American women television presenters
Howard University School of Law alumni
Living people
Place of birth missing (living people)
United States Virgin Islands lawyers
University of Maryland, College Park alumni